Dragotina may refer to:
Dragotina, Greece, a village in Greece
Dragotina, Russia, a village in Pskov Oblast, Russia
 Dragotina, Croatia, a village near Glina